Imoan Claiborne (born July 20, 1992) is a Canadian football cornerback who is currently a free agent. He played college football at Northwestern State.

College career
Claiborne was an All-American cornerback who had four interceptions and three fumble recoveries last fall for the Demons. He had four-year totals of 103 tackles, six interceptions and 11 pass breakups in 37 games, 28 starts, 22 in his final two seasons. He made 48 tackles and a team-high seven pass breakups while playing in 10 ½ games as a senior. He was awarded the FCS All-America honors from The Sports Network and first-team All-Southland and All-Louisiana honors before playing in the 66th Annual Reese's Senior Bowl game.

Professional career

St. Louis Rams 
After going undrafted in the 2015 NFL Draft Claiborne signed with the St. Louis Rams of the NFL. In a joint practice with the Dallas Cowboys in August a brawl broke out and Imoan Claiborne punched Pro Bowl wide receiver Dez Bryant in the face. Claiborne was released on September 1.

Tampa Bay Buccaneers 
Claiborne was signed to the Tampa Bay Buccaneers practice squad on September 7, 2015.

Ottawa Redblacks 
On February 29, 2016, Claiborne signed with the Ottawa Redblacks of the Canadian Football League. On October 10, 2016, the Redblacks placed Claiborne on their practice squad.

References

External links
Tampa Bay Buccaneers bio
Career transactions

1992 births
Living people
American football cornerbacks
Canadian football defensive backs
American players of Canadian football
Ottawa Redblacks players
Northwestern State Demons football players
Tampa Bay Buccaneers players
St. Louis Rams players